Dmx-like 2 is a protein that in humans is encoded by the DMXL2 gene.

Function 

This gene encodes a protein with 12 WD domains. Proteins with WD domains are involved in many functions including participation in signal transduction pathways. Participation of the encoded protein in regulation of the Notch signaling pathway has been demonstrated in vitro using several human celines. A gene encoding a similar protein is located on chromosome 5. Multiple transcript variants encoding different isoforms have been found for this gene.

Clinical relevance

Haplosufficiency of Dmxl2 has been identified as the cause of Polyendocrine-polyneuropathy syndrome, and delayed puberty. Research has indicated that this is a result of altered function of CNS synapses (in which the protein product of Dmxl2 is expressed) causing altered activation of the GnRH neurons of the hypothalamus.

See also
 DmX gene - the homolog in D. melanogaster

References

Further reading